The 1997–98 Northern Premier League season was the 30th in the history of the Northern Premier League, a football competition in England. Teams were divided into two divisions; the Premier and the First. It was known as the Unibond League for sponsorship reasons.

Premier Division

The Premier League featured three new teams:

 Altrincham relegated from the Football Conference
 Leigh RMI promoted as runners up from Division One
 Radcliffe Borough promoted as champions from Division One

League table

Results

Division One

Division One featured five new teams:

 Buxton relegated from the NPL Premier Division
 Belper Town promoted as runners-up from the NCEFL Premier Division
 Trafford promoted as champions from the NWCFL Division One
 Whitby Town promoted as champions from the Northern League Division One
 Witton Albion relegated from the NPL Premier Division

League table

Results

Promotion and relegation 

In the thirtieth season of the Northern Premier League Barrow (as champions) were automatically promoted to the Football Conference. Radcliffe Borough and Alfreton Town were relegated to the First Division; these two clubs were replaced by relegated Conference sides Gateshead and Stalybridge Celtic, First Division winners Whitby Town and second placed Worksop Town. In the First Division Workington and Buxton left the League at the end of the season and were replaced by newly admitted Hucknall Town and Burscough.

Cup results
Challenge Cup: Teams from both leagues.

Altrincham bt. Gainsborough Trinity

President's Cup: 'Plate' competition for losing teams in the NPL Cup.

Runcorn bt. Guiseley

Peter Swales Shield: Between Champions of NPL Premier Division and Winners of the NPL Cup.

Altrincham bt. Barrow

References

External links 
 Northern Premier League Tables at RSSSF

1997-98
6